"None of My Business" is a song by English singer and songwriter Cher Lloyd, released on 19 October 2018 through Universal Music Group. The song was announced in a video posted to Lloyd's social media platforms on 16 October 2018, revealing an introduction clip and release date for the single.

Background
The song is Lloyd's first single in two years. In a press release for the song, Lloyd stated, "I've waited so long for people to finally listen to my new music, which I've worked so hard for a long time, and think 'None Of My Business' is a perfect taste for what's to come - I have never been so excited in my life to present my new music."

The single was considered a 'warm-up' track. Despite the lack of promotion, the single received over 500 million streams across platforms, with 57 million streams on Spotify along with 47 million views on YouTube as of October 2021.

Composition
Musically, "None of My Business" has a length of three minutes and four seconds and moves at a tempo of 134 beats per minute. It incorporates "breezy production courtesy of Hitimpulse" and lyrically features Lloyd making it "very clear that she has moved on from a former flame". During the chorus she sings, "Damn, I heard that you and her been having issues/I wish you the best, I hope that she can fix you/You'll be calling me the second that it hits you, but baby, this is none of my business." The song has been described as "sassy and charismatic".

Critical reception
Mike Nied of Idolator called the song Lloyd "at her most liberated, and she has rarely sounded better." Writing for The Guardian, Kate Solomon wrote that the "sing-songy nursery rhyme feel and breezy delivery don't hide the cutting tone", and compared it to anyone who has "spent an hour scrolling through an ex's Insta feed before sending 600 screengrabs to the group chat".

Music video
The music video for the song was released through YouTube on 19 October 2018 in the United Kingdom, and in the United States on 22 October 2018. The video was filmed in Margate on the beach and in Dreamland amusement park. In the week of 9 November 2018 the video charted for one week at 94 on the UK Official Video Streaming Chart Top 100.

Personnel
Credits adapted from Tidal.
 Cher Lloyd – vocals
 Hitimpulse – production, mixer
 Alexsej Vlasenko – songwriting, drums
 Jeremy Chacon – songwriting, bass guitar
 Jonas Kalisch – songwriting, keyboards
 Henrik Meinke – songwriting, synthesizing
 Kate Morgan – songwriting
 iamBaddluck – songwriting
 Lex Barkey – mastering

Charts

Release history

References

2018 songs
2018 singles
Cher Lloyd songs
Songs written by Jeremy Chacon